In theoretical computer science and formal language theory, a prefix grammar is a type of string rewriting system, consisting of a set of string rewriting rules, and similar to a formal grammar or a semi-Thue system.  What is specific about prefix grammars is not the shape of their rules, but the way in which they are applied: only prefixes are rewritten. The prefix grammars describe exactly all regular languages.

Formal definition
A prefix grammar G is a 3-tuple, (Σ, S, P), where 
Σ is a finite alphabet
S is a finite set of base strings over Σ
P is a finite set of production rules of the form u → v where u and v are strings over Σ

For strings x, y, we write x →G y (and say: G can derive y from x in one step) if there are strings u, v, w such that , and v → w is in P.  Note that  is a binary relation on the strings of Σ.

Example
The prefix grammar
Σ = {0, 1}
S = {01, 10}
P = {0 → 010, 10 → 100}
describes the language defined by the regular expression

See also 
 Regular grammar

References

Formal languages